Rhamphomyia sulcatella is a species of dance flies, in the fly family Empididae. It is included in the subgenus Rhamphomyia.

References

Rhamphomyia
Diptera of Europe
Taxa named by James Edward Collin
Insects described in 1926